Sarah Carr may refer to:

Sarah Carr (politician), British Liberal Democrat politician who stood as a candidate for Hereford and South Herefordshire at the 2010 general election
Sally Carr, born Sarah Cecilia Carr, lead singer of the 1970s pop group "Middle of the Road"

See also
Carr (surname)